The Greater Vancouver Zoo is a  zoo located in Aldergrove, British Columbia, Canada. The zoo was established in 1970 as the Vancouver Game Farm. The institution was renamed twice in the 1990s, renamed the Greater Vancouver Zoological Centre in 1995, before it adopted its present name in 1999.

History
In the late 1960s, businessman Pat Hines purchased  in Aldergrove, British Columbia to construct a game farm. At first, Hines registered the business as the World Wide Game Farm Ltd., but on August 20, 1970, the site was opened to the public as the Vancouver Game Farm. The first animal to arrive was a llama named "Dennis", who came from Mount Vernon, Washington. Soon after, animals of every size and description began to fill the newly constructed paddocks. Hines operated the game farm with his wife, Ann, other family members, and their employees.  Their daughter Eleanor and her husband, Hugh Oakes, eventually took over management of the facility until 1991, when it was sold.

Under new ownership, the game farm underwent many changes, including a new name. In 1995, it was renamed the Greater Vancouver Zoological Centre, since it is part of the Greater Vancouver area rather than being a part of Vancouver.  Improvements included the construction of new animal enclosures,  narrow-gauge miniature train rides, a picnic park with covered gazebos and barbecues, expanded landscaping, a remodeled entrance, more parking spaces, interpretive and educational programs and activities. In 1998, the North American Wilds exhibit  opened, providing a narrative safari bus ride for visitors through one area where carnivores like black bears, coyotes, and Vancouver Island wolves live together; and travel into another habitat where grazers like the Roosevelt elk, black-tailed deer, and North American plains bison roamed.  But after four years, there were more changes.

In 1999, the facility went through another ownership change and was eventually renamed the Greater Vancouver Zoo. During this period, the zoo focused more towards conservation and to building up its educational programs.

In 2000, the Greater Vancouver Zoo joined the Oregon Spotted Frog Recovery Program. At the time, the frog was the only species to receive an "emergency listing" as an endangered species in Canada. The zoo is currently still involved with this program, releasing frogs into the wild after they are weighed, measured, and tagged. Furthermore, many animals have been rescued over the years and eventually released back into the wild, but some animals like "Shadow", a grizzly bear, could not be returned because she had been abandoned as a young cub and was not able to learn the skills needed to survive in the wild.  In addition, the majority of the zoo's reptiles, exotic birds, various cat species, and many others were taken in for numerous reasons, such as being rescued from the illegal pet trade or after being abandoned as pets.

21st century
New educational programs were introduced by the zoo. In 2005, the "Radical Raptor Birds of Prey" show was created, in which eagles, owls, hawks, and falcons performed free flying presentations at the zoo's amphitheatre.  Since then, the zoo has introduced a one-week summer camp program for children ages 10–14 to handle and learn about the many birds of prey species since 2007.  In 2006, the zoo opened its indoor "Animalasium – Educational Training Centre" to teach the public about conservation and education for animals and their environments.  In addition, the centre will also be used for various other functions, such as birthday parties, group sessions and guest speaker events.  Furthermore, the zoo offers educational walking tours for school groups that is based on a B.C. Ministry of Education curriculum.

The new owners also completed building new enclosures for the grizzly bear, the Arctic wolf, the camels, the mountain sheep, and the hippopotamus, while making improvements to the giraffe enclosure.  On August 23, 2008, the zoo introduced a pair of muskox to their new  enclosure, which with the Arctic wolf, Arctic fox, reindeer, and emperor, and snow goose enclosures, completes their new Arctic Section exhibit.

The zoo's new general manager, Serge Lussier, announced expansive plans for a more immersive "zoo of the future" in spring 2020, including several multi-million dollar projects expected to be completed over the course of the next several years. This included plans to re-structure over half of its area into a sprawling, multi-species savannah landscape, as well as an engaging area for big cats, and an observation walkway. However, despite seeing record-breaking summer attendance owing to its status as an outdoor attraction, progress was slowed due to the COVID-19 pandemic. Despite the setbacks, the zoo underwent extensive changes; renovations were made on many of the zoo's habitats and fences, including its giraffe viewing platform, and a larger front entrance was constructed along with a new gift shop and guest services area. Among the zoo's new animals are three grizzly bear cubs orphaned in the wild in Alberta.

In the summer of 2021, the zoo opened a new walkthrough section, Mesozoic Adventure, a Jurassic Park-esque section featuring a dozen life-sized animatronic dinosaurs. Also in 2021, the zoo received the Colonel G.D. Dailley conservation award for its work in Oregon spotted frog recovery.

Animals

Mammals

Addax (critically endangered)
African lion (vulnerable)
White lion
North American black bear (least concern)
Bactrian camel (critically endangered)
Capybara (least concern)
Cheetah (vulnerable)
Common eland (least concern)
Black burro (least concern)
Dromedary camel (domestic)
Elk (least concern)
Grant's zebra (least concern)
Grey wolf (least concern)
Grizzly bear (least concern)
Hippopotamus (vulnerable)
Jaguar (near threatened)
Miniature horse (least concern)
Mountain goat (least concern)
Muskox (least concern)
Nilgai (least concern)
Onager (near threatened)
Patagonian Mara (near threatened)
Père david's deer (extinct in the wild)
Plains bison (near threatened)
Red fox (least concern)
Red panda (endangered)
Red river hog (least concern)
Red-necked wallaby (least concern)
Reindeer (vulnerable)
Ring-tailed lemur (endangered)
Roosevelt elk (least concern)
Rothschild's giraffe (endangered)
Scimitar-horned oryx (extinct in the wild)
Siberian tiger (endangered)
Sika deer (least concern)
Snow leopard (vulnerable)
White rhinoceros (near threatened)
White-tailed deer (least concern)
Zebu (domestic)

Birds

American flamingo (least concern)
Bald eagle (least concern)
Blue and gold macaw (least concern)
Chilean flamingo (near threatened)
Common ostrich (least concern)
Emu (least concern)
Helmeted guineafowl (least concern)
Indian Peafowl (least concern)
Marabou stork (least concern)
Muscovy duck (least concern)
Snow goose (least concern)

Reptile and Amphibian
African spurred tortoise (vulnerable)
Ball python (least concern)
Gopher snake (least concern)
Hognose snake (least concern)
Leopard gecko (least concern)
Oregon spotted frog (vulnerable)
Spur-thighed tortoise (least concern)
Western painted turtle (vulnerable)
White's tree frog (least concern)

Notable animals

Charlie, a southern white rhinoceros 1967–2013
Tina, an Asian elephant 1970–2004
OJ, a jaguar 1998–2016
Shadow, a grizzly bear born 1999
Boomer, an African lion born 2007
Hana, a Siberian tiger born 2011

Accusations of incidents
In 1997, two reports by Zoocheck Canada and UK veterinarian Samantha Lindley called on the Greater Vancouver Zoo to improve conditions for the animals it holds, such as rhinoceros and big cats. By 2003, few improvements had been made.

On May 31, 2006, the Crown Counsel of British Columbia laid formal charges against the Greater Vancouver Zoo, in accordance with the Prevention of Cruelty to Animals Act, for failing to provide adequate facilities for a baby hippo acquired in October 2004. This was the first case of a major Canadian zoo being charged with cruelty to animals.  However, in January 2007, the case was stayed, as crown counsel believed, with the opening of a new habitat for hippos, that it was no longer in the public interest.  This was not seen as vindication for the Greater Vancouver Zoo nor a statement that charges were unjustified. The zoo eventually lost its Canadian Association of Zoos and Aquariums accreditation over this incident for two years.

In May 2008, someone broke into the zoo when it was closed, entered the spider monkey enclosure, killed Jocko (the male monkey), and kidnapped Mia (the female monkey).  The case is still unsolved and there is currently a $3,000 reward for Mia's safe return.

In June 2008, the zoo made headlines when Skye, a female golden eagle, was killed by a lioness after landing in the lion enclosure, following a run-in with a murder of crows. Two months after that incident, a four-year-old boy was landed on by a Harris's hawk when he volunteered in the Radical Raptors Birds of Prey show.  According to the zoo's spokesperson, the hawk mistook the boy's head for a perch. After the incident, the zoo removed Harris's hawks from the bird show and put a stop to audience participation.

On April 20, 2009, it was reported that four zebras had died in early March, shortly after two African buffalo were introduced to their enclosure. The zoo did not make the incident public at the time. A spokesperson for the Vancouver Humane Society stated that the zebras were between 5 and 15 years old, and probably died from exertional myopathy, a muscle disease causing damage to muscle tissues which is caused by physiological changes (often extreme exertion, struggle, or stress). The spokesperson also stated that African buffalo are extremely dangerous and although the two species co-exist in the wild, they should not have been placed together in an enclosed space. The British Columbia Society for the Prevention of Cruelty to Animals has launched an investigation of the incident, while the Vancouver Humane Society will ask the Canadian Association of Zoos and Aquariums to investigate the incident and review the zoo's accreditation. The zoo replaced the dead animals with two new zebras.

Two giraffes died within a week in November 2011—both three-year-old Amryn and 23-year-old Eleah were found dead inside their barns. A 12-year-old giraffe was found dead inside its barn November 4, 2012.

In August 2022, There were nine adult grey wolves and six cubs at the zoo in Aldergrove, B.C. Someone clipped a fence in the Wolf habitat, leading to the wolves escaping, all but one (Tempest) have been accounted for, including one (Chia) which was found dead at the side of 264 Street. The missing wolf is still on the loose as of August 17. The Zoo has been closed since, but is expected to re-open on Saturday 20 August 2022.

Notes

References

External links

Tourist attractions in Vancouver
Zoos in British Columbia
Zoos established in 1970
1970 establishments in British Columbia